Lic. Jesús Terán Peredo International Airport, also known as Aguascalientes International Airport, serves Aguascalientes, the capital city of the state of Aguascalientes in Mexico. It handles national and international air traffic for the city of Aguascalientes. The airport was named after Jesús Terán Peredo, an Aguascalientes governor from 1855 to 1857, and one of the first persons to recognize Benito Juárez as Mexico's president.

Its commercial facilities consist of a sole terminal, with four contact positions plus three remotes used by non-mainline carriers. The terminal has been recently remodeled and expanded to meet the growing demand. The airport is now able to handle 1.5 million passengers, although it only handled 0.4 million during 2012. Several amenities have been recently opened, such as the introduction of a new restaurant on the upper level of the airport, new check-in counters, among many others. The airport has become one of the most important terminals in the Central-West region of Mexico.

Facilities 

It handled 475,600 passengers in 2020, and 793,400 passengers in 2021.

Airlines and destinations

Destinations map

Statistics

Passengers

Busiest routes

References

External links
 Aguascalientes Airport at Grupo Aeroportuario del Pacífico
 
 
 

Airports in Mexico
Aguascalientes City
Buildings and structures in Aguascalientes